The Oberschule zum Dom, a grammar school in Lübeck and the Schleswig-Holstein area of Germany was founded in 1905 during the final years of the German Empire under Kaiser Wilhelm II.
The school survived the bombing carried out on the city of Lübeck by the Royal Air Force during the second world war.

The School has long been a Gymnasium. It ranks in the top three schools in Lübeck.

Location
The OzD is opposited next to the Lübeck Cathedral (Dom), this provides it with a very central location within the city. Transport links are very good, being conveniently situated just 75m away from the Fegefeuer bus stop (Haltestelle) which is serviced by the Lübeck bus company with routes to all the major suburbs of the city and some nearby villages. This provides the school with the ability to accept students not solely from the city but also from slightly further a field.

Academics and extra-curricular activities
We welcome about 800 students, aged 10 to 18, and 65 teachers. When the students arrive at the OzD in Year 5, our students can choose between English and French as their first foreign language. Later, they can add French, Spanish, and Latin to their languages portfolio. Students who are preparing for their A-Levels can specialise and choose between a variety of subjects: humanities (History or Geography), modern languages (Spanish or French), science (Physics or Biology) and Physical Education. Three weeks during the year focus on project-oriented learning, vocational orientation in the form of internships and class trips with different pedagogical focuses.
At our school, we see sustainability, cultural awareness and media literacy as our key priorities. To promote any of these, open-mindedness is a fundamental competence. We want to encourage our students to go to different countries in order to share intercultural experiences with other Europeans and to learn from each other by sharing their lives for a certain period of time. This is why we are grateful and proud to be an accredited school within the Erasmus+ network. 
We animate our students to discover and develop their individual potential in different ways, since we think that experiences gained in international exchanges are an important way to learn about crucial values such as respect, tolerance, and active citizenship. 
The OzD is also a cooperation school of the Landessportverband Schleswig-Holstein. Our school life is also enriched by a wide range of musical activities with a big band, choirs, orchestra and musicals. 
We wish to see modern teaching that meets subject-specific and social requirements, that is as well taking up and deepening the pupils’ interests. Therefore, we would like our students to discover and develop their individual potential in an appreciative school environment.

References

External links

Official OzD (Lübeck) website
Official Hansestadt Lübeck website

Schools in Schleswig-Holstein
Educational institutions established in 1905
Buildings and structures in Lübeck
1905 establishments in Germany